Krimpenerwaard is a municipality, a region and a former water board of the Netherlands. It is a rural area located in the east of the province of South Holland, just south of Gouda and east of the Rotterdam conurbation. It is bordered on the north by the river Hollandse IJssel, on the south by the river Lek and on the east by the stream Vlist.

Krimpenerwaard obtains its name from the fact that "Krimp" used to mean a bend in a river and "Waard" is the Dutch word for an interfluvial area between the winter dikes of different river channels (in this case, the Lek and the Hollandse IJssel). There are other such waarden in this area. The Lopikerwaard lies to the east; the Zuidplaspolder to the west. The name Krimpenerwaard first appeared in the historical records in 944.

The municipality is named after the region Krimpenerwaard and was formed by a merger of the municipalities of Nederlek, Ouderkerk, Vlist, Bergambacht and Schoonhoven on 1 January 2015.

Geography
The towns and villages in the Krimpenerwaard are:
 Schoonhoven
 Bergambacht
 Stolwijk
 Ammerstol
 Haastrecht
 Berkenwoude
 Lekkerkerk
 Krimpen aan de Lek
 Vlist
 Gouderak
 Ouderkerk aan den IJssel

Topography

Dutch topographic map of the municipality of Krimpenerwaard, June 2015

Notable people 

 John of Schoonhoven (1356/7 in Schoonhoven – 1432) a Flemish theologian and writer
 Herman Naiwincx (1623 in Schoonhoven – 1670) a Dutch Golden Age landscape painter and printmaker
 Arnoldus Montanus (ca.1625 – 1683 in Schoonhoven) a teacher and author on theology, history and geography.
 Regnier de Graaf (1641 in Schoonhoven – 1673) a Dutch physician and anatomist who made key discoveries in reproductive biology
 Justine Constance Wirix-van Mansvelt (1876 in Schoonhoven – 1937) an expert on Dante Alighieri (1265–1321)
 Andreas Rinkel (1889 in Ouderkerk aan de Amstel – 1979) a Dutch priest and the 19th Archbishop of Utrecht from 1937 to 1970. 
 Reijer Hooykaas (1906 in Schoonhoven – 1994) a Dutch historian of science
 Wim Kok (1938 in Bergambacht – 2018) a Dutch politician, Prime Minister of the Netherlands 1994 to 2002
 Marrie Bot (born 1946 in Bergambacht) a Dutch photographer and graphic designer
 Martin van Bruinessen (born 1946 in Schoonhoven) a Dutch academic, anthropologist and author
 Max van den Berg (born 1946 in Ammerstol) a Dutch politician
 Jamai Loman (born 1986) a Dutch singer, brought up in Schoonhoven

Sport 
 Jacob van der Kop (1868 in Schoonhoven – 1945) a sports shooter, competed at the 1908 Summer Olympics
 Gijs Lamoree (1903 in Schoonhoven – 1966) a Dutch athlete, competed in the men's long jump and the men's triple jump at the 1928 Summer Olympics
 Hein Vergeer (born 1961 in Haastrecht) a former speed skater, competed at the 1988 Winter Olympics
 Leo Visser (born 1966 in Haastrecht) is a Dutch former speed skater, four time medallist at the 1988 and the 1992 Summer Olympics 
 Edith van Dijk (born 1973 in Haastrecht) a Dutch swimmer and 6-fold world champion
 Yvonne van Vlerken (born 1978 in Krimpen aan de Lek) a Dutch triathlete and duathlete
 Patrick Roest (born 1995 in Lekkerkerk) a Dutch speed skater

Gallery

Notes

External links

 Nieko Jongerius's website on the Krimpenerwaard
 Map of Krimpenerwaard on Google Maps
 English page on the website for the Schieland en de Krimpenerwaard District Water Board

 
Municipalities of South Holland
Municipalities of the Netherlands established in 2015